Eddie Benton, Jr. (born February 16, 1975) is an American college women's basketball coach, former assistant coach for the women's program at Mississippi State University. He is best known for his collegiate playing career at the University of Vermont between 1992 and 1996. Benton then had a short-lived professional career before becoming a college coach.

Playing career

High school
Benton, a Pittsburgh, Pennsylvania native, attended Perry Traditional Academy from 1988 to 1992. He was the team's sixth man during his sophomore and junior seasons before becoming the starting point guard as a senior in 1991–92. Benton helped the Perry Commodores to their school's first state title during his junior year. In his final year, the Pittsburgh Post-Gazette "Fabulous Five" team after also being named an all-City League player.

College
Benton continued his basketball career at the University of Vermont; he went on to have the most decorated career in Vermont's program's history during his tenure. He scored a still-standing school record 2,474 points, including a record 54-point game against Drexel on January 29, 1994. His point total was the second-highest in America East Conference history, and for his career he averaged 23.8 points per game. In three of his four seasons, Benton finished in the top 12 nationally. Benton scored his 1,000th career point during his sophomore season and became only the third NCAA Division I men's basketball player ever to record 1,000 points before his 19th birthday (others include LSU's Shaquille O'Neal and Duke's Mike Gminski). He was named a First Team All-America East Conference performer in all four seasons, becoming just the third player in conference history to achieve that. In 1995–96 Benton won the Frances Pomeroy Naismith Award as the best senior player under 6-feet tall (he is 5'11"). At the time of Benton's graduation in 1996, he held 15 different offensive category school records, including career field goals, free throws, three-pointers and scoring average. He also recorded 458 assists, the third-highest total in Vermont history as of his graduation.

Professional
Benton went undrafted in the 1996 NBA draft. He spent the 1996–97 season playing in the Continental Basketball Association for the Grand Rapids Hoops. Over the following two seasons he played internationally in leagues in Israel, the Netherlands, and Venezuela.

Coaching career
After his short-lived professional career, Benton returned to the United States and got into coaching. His first job came in 1999 for the men's team at La Roche College, a Division III school in his native Pittsburgh. Staying local, he then spent three seasons with the men's program at Robert Morris University. In 2004, La Roche hired Benton as the head women's basketball coach, where he would stay for eight years and compile 108 overall wins. He led La Roche to two consecutive Allegheny Mountain Collegiate Conference (AMCC) championships, back-to-back Division III Tournament appearances, and in 2012 was named the AMCC Coach of the Year. Benton spent the 2012–13 season as an assistant for the women's team at Saint Francis University before landing at Duquesne University in 2013–14. From 2013 to 2017, Benton served as an assistant coach for the women's team at Duquesne. After serving the 2017–18 season as an assistant coach of the women's basketball team at the University of Cincinnati, Benton accepted an assistant coaching position with Brown. He stayed with them for three seasons before accepting an assistant coach position at Mississippi State to work under head coach Nikki McCray.

See also
 List of NCAA Division I men's basketball career free throw scoring leaders

References

External links
 Mississippi State bio

1975 births
Living people
American expatriate basketball people in Israel
American expatriate basketball people in the Netherlands
American expatriate basketball people in Venezuela
American men's basketball players
American women's basketball coaches
Basketball coaches from Pennsylvania
Basketball players from Pittsburgh
Brown Bears women's basketball coaches
Cincinnati Bearcats women's basketball coaches
Duquesne Dukes women's basketball coaches
Grand Rapids Hoops players
Mississippi State Bulldogs women's basketball coaches
Point guards
Robert Morris Colonials men's basketball coaches
Saint Francis Red Flash women's basketball coaches
Sportspeople from Pittsburgh
Vermont Catamounts men's basketball players